David Aaron Ogden (January 10, 1770 – June 9, 1829) was a U.S. Representative from New York and a member of the prominent Ogden family.

Early life
Born in Morristown in the Province of New Jersey, he was the son of Sarah Frances (Ludlow) and Abraham Ogden.  His sister, Gertrude Gouverneur Ogden (1777–1850), was married to Joshua Waddington (1755–1844), a founder of the Bank of New York.

Ogden attended King's College (now Columbia University), New York City. He studied law and was admitted to the bar in November 1791, beginning practice in Newark, New Jersey.

Career
He became counselor at law in New Jersey in 1796. He was concerned in the negotiations as to whether Aaron Burr, also from Newark and an executor of his grandfather's will, or Thomas Jefferson became president after the election of 1800, and was widely thought to have tried to get Burr become president. Alexander Hamilton was for a time a legal partner with Ogden and his brother, Thomas Ludlow Ogden (1773–1844), until Hamilton's death in 1804.

Ogden, with his brothers Thomas Ludlow Ogden and Gouverneur Ogden (1778–1851), developed through the Ogden Land Company huge tracts of northern New York state. Through their position as counsel to the Holland Land Company, David and Thomas Ogden influenced the settlement of Western New York, the construction of the Erie Canal, the determination of property law in New York, even political competition in the Republican Party.  Their company was succeeded in buying the majority of the Seneca Indians' reservation by the reported use of bribery and intimidation in August 1826.

Public office
He served as associate judge of the court of common pleas from 1811 to 1815. He also was a member of the New York State Assembly in 1814–15.

Ogden was elected as a Federalist to the Fifteenth Congress (March 4, 1817 – March 3, 1819). He was First Judge of the St. Lawrence County Court from 1820 to 1824 and from 1825 to 1829, and he was one of the commissioners to settle the boundary between Canada and the United States.

Personal life
Ogden moved to Hamilton (now Waddington), St. Lawrence County, New York, and built a large mansion on Ogden Island.  On May 30, 1797, he married Rebecca Cornell Edwards (1776–1852), the daughter of Isaac Edwards (1765–1775) and Mary Cornell. They were the parents of:

 Isaac Edwards Ogden (1798–), who married Euphrosine Mericult, Letitia Hanna, and Elizabeth Chamberlain 
 Sarah Ogden (1799–1844), who married Charles Russell Codman (1784–1852) 
 William Ogden (1801–1838), who married Harriet Seton Ogden (1806–1884), in 1832. 
 Wallace Ogden (1803–1828) 
 Mary E. Ogden (1805–1853), who married Herman LeRoy Newbold (d. 1854)
 Samuel Cornell Ogden (1806–1862), who married Sarah F. Waddington (1810–1903), his first cousin, in 1843.
 Catharine H. Ogden (1808–1874), who married Samuel Ogden (1803–1879), her first cousin 
 Susan W. Ogden (1810–1892), who married William Roebuck 
 Rebecca E. Ogden (1811–1886), who married George B. Ogden 
 Duncan Campbell Ogden (1813–1859), who married Miriam Gratz Meredith, and Elizabeth Cox, and was a member of the First Texas Legislature.
 David A. Ogden, Jr. (1815–), who married Louisa Lanfear

Ogden died in Montreal in Lower Canada (in modern-day Quebec) on June 9, 1829 and was interred in Brookside Cemetery, Waddington, New York.

Legacy
Ogdensburg, New York, a city in St. Lawrence County, New York, United States, was named for him and his uncle, Samuel Ogden (1746—1810).

References
Notes

Sources

 Ogden papers on land development in William L. Clements Library, The University of Michigan

1770 births
1829 deaths
People from St. Lawrence County, New York
People from Morristown, New Jersey
New York (state) state court judges
Members of the New York State Assembly
Columbia College (New York) alumni
Federalist Party members of the United States House of Representatives from New York (state)